Albert Dunlop (21 April 1932 in Liverpool, England - 6 March 1990) was an English football goalkeeper.

Signed by Everton as a junior in 1950 Dunlop had to wait until October 1956 to make his debut when he replaced Jimmy O'Neill at Old Trafford. It was to be remarkable debut for him, Manchester United were the reigning League Champions and had been unbeaten in the last 26 games but Everton won 5–2. In the next game Arsenal were beaten 4-0 and Dunlop kept his place until the end of the season.

Dunlop was unchallenged for the goalkeeper's jersey for the next six years and in 1960-61 was an ever-present and helped the club to 5th in the first division, their highest post war position. The following season, he was to play in the first 29 games before being replaced by Gordon West as Everton started to build for the future.

Dunlop's last game for Everton was to be the club's best post war moment as they beat Fulham at Goodison Park to clinch the 1962-63 League title, during the summer he was to leave and joined Wrexham. He then joined Rhyl in September 1965 as a goalkeeper initially, and by February 1966 had been appointed full-time manager and commercial director of the club. He was quite a flamboyant character, and when the club was going through a rough patch he once selected himself as centre-forward to see what the problems were at first hand.

References

External links

1932 births
1990 deaths
English footballers
Everton F.C. players
Association football goalkeepers
English Football League players
Footballers from Liverpool
Wrexham A.F.C. players
Rhyl F.C. players
English cricketers
Cheshire cricketers